{{DISPLAYTITLE:Exotic R4}}
In mathematics, an exotic  is a differentiable manifold that is homeomorphic (i.e. shape preserving) but not diffeomorphic (i.e. non smooth) to the Euclidean space  The first examples were found in 1982 by Michael Freedman and others, by using the contrast between Freedman's theorems about topological 4-manifolds, and Simon Donaldson's theorems about smooth 4-manifolds.

Prior to this construction, non-diffeomorphic smooth structures on spheresexotic sphereswere already known to exist, although the question of the existence of such structures for the particular case of the 4-sphere remained open (and still remains open as of 2023).

Small exotic R4s
An exotic  is called small if it can be smoothly embedded as an open subset of the standard 

Small exotic  can be constructed by starting with a non-trivial smooth 5-dimensional h-cobordism (which exists by Donaldson's proof that the h-cobordism theorem fails in this dimension) and using Freedman's theorem that the topological h-cobordism theorem holds in this dimension.

Large exotic R4s
An exotic  is called large if it cannot be smoothly embedded as an open subset of the standard 

Examples of large exotic  can be constructed using the fact that compact 4-manifolds can often be split as a topological sum (by Freedman's work), but cannot be split as a smooth sum (by Donaldson's work).

 showed that there is a maximal exotic  into which all other  can be smoothly embedded as open subsets.

Related exotic structures

It is not known (as of 2022) whether or not there are any exotic 4-spheres; such an exotic 4-sphere would be a counterexample to the smooth generalized Poincaré conjecture in dimension 4. Some plausible candidates are given by Gluck twists.

See also
Akbulut cork - tool used to construct exotic 's from classes in 
Atlas (topology)

Notes

References

 

 

4-manifolds
Differential structures